2 Samuel 3 is the third chapter of the Second Book of Samuel in the Old Testament of the Christian Bible or the second part of Books of Samuel in the Hebrew Bible. According to Jewish tradition  the book was attributed to the prophet Samuel, with additions by the prophets Gad and Nathan, but modern scholars view it as a composition of a number of independent texts of various ages from c. 630–540 BCE. This chapter contains the account of David's reign in Hebron. This is within a section comprising 1 Samuel 16 to 2 Samuel 5 which records the rise of David as the king of Israel, and a section comprising 2 Samuel 2–8 which deals with the period when David set up his kingdom.

Text
This chapter was originally written in the Hebrew language. It is divided into 39 verses.

Textual witnesses
Some early manuscripts containing the text of this chapter in Hebrew are of the Masoretic Text tradition, which includes the Codex Cairensis (895), Aleppo Codex (10th century), and Codex Leningradensis (1008). Fragments containing parts of this chapter in Hebrew were found among the Dead Sea Scrolls including 4Q51 (4QSam; 100–50 BCE) with extant verses 1–15, 17, 21, 23–25, 27–39. 

Extant ancient manuscripts of a translation into Koine Greek known as the Septuagint (originally was made in the last few centuries BCE) include Codex Vaticanus (B; B; 4th century) and Codex Alexandrinus (A; A; 5th century).

Old Testament references
:

Places 

Bahurim
Beersheba
Dan
Geshur
Gibeon
Hebron

Analysis
The narrative of David's reign in Hebron in 2 Samuel 1:1–5:5 has the following structure:
A. Looking back to the final scenes of 1 Samuel (1:1)
B. David receives Saul's crown (1:2-12)
C. David executes Saul's killer (1:13-16)
D. David's lament for Saul and Jonathan (1:17-27)
E. Two kings in the land (2:1-3:6)
E'. One king in the land: Abner switches sides (3:7-27)
D'. David's lament for Abner (3:28-39)
C'. David executes Ishbaal's killers (4:1-12)
B'. David wears Saul's crown (5:1-3)
A'. Looking forward to David's reign in Jerusalem (5:4-5)

David's narrative of his ascension to the throne in Hebron is framed by an opening verse that looks backward to the final chapters of 1 Samuel (Saul's death and David's refuge in Ziklag) and closing verses that look forward to David's rule in Jerusalem (2 Samuel 5). The action begins when David received Saul's crown and concludes when he was finally able to wear that crown. David executes the Amalekite who claims to have assisted Saul with his suicide and those who murdered Ishbaal. Two laments were recorded: one for Saul and Jonathan and another shorter one for Abner. At the center are the two key episodes: the existence of two kings in the land (David and Ishbaal), because Joab's forces could not conquer Saul's territory on the battlefield. However, this was resolved when Ishbaal foolishly challenged Abner's loyalty, causing Abner to switch sides that eventually brought
Saul's kingdom under Davidic rule.

The House of David strengthened (3:1–5)
After the temporarily suspended hostility (2 Samuel 2:28), the struggle between the houses of David and Saul continued for around two years (2 Samuel 2:10), but throughout the period of time, David became stronger (verse 1; a continuing theme of 2 Samuel 2:30–31), as demonstrated by the list of sons born to him at Hebron (verses 2–5).

Verse 1
Now there was a long war between the house of Saul and the house of David. But David grew stronger and stronger, and the house of Saul grew weaker and weaker.
"Long war": although Ish-bosheth might be too weak to carry on the war, David apparently waited with firm reliance on God's promise until all Israel came over to him.

Abner joins David (3:6–21)

Ish-bosheth's quarrel with Abner was concerning his alleged relationship with, Rizpah, one of Saul's concubines and the mother of two of his sons (2 Samuel 21:8). With his stature in court increasing, Abner's action could be perceived as an open bid for Ishbaal's throne (cf. 1 Kings 2:13–25, where Adonijah made a similar bid on Abishag, David's concubine, for Solomon's throne and 2 Samuel 16:20–23, where Absalom openly visited David's harem). Abner replied to the accusation angrily and defiantly, without admitting that he was in the wrong, but dismissed the affair as insignificant in comparison with the loyalty he has shown to the house of Saul (verse 8). After this, Abner sent a message to David at Hebron, seeking a pact (a 'covenant') that would transfer Israelite territories (now under Ishbaal) to David. David set his own conditions: the return of Michal, Saul's daughter, with political implications of David legality to claim Saul's throne. As Michal was forced to marry another man, the prohibition of remarriage in Deuteronomy 24:1–4 does not apply here, and for this reason (and Abner's influence in court), Ish-bosheth complied with David's request (verses 15–16). Abner successfully negotiated with both sides: senior leaders of Israel, who were dissatisfied with Ishbaal and hoped to withstand the Philistines with David as happened in the past, as well as the support of Saul's tribe and his own, the Benjaminites. His successes led to a big feast with David, probably on the occasion of sealing the covenant.

Verse 17
And Abner conferred with the elders of Israel, saying, "For some time past you have been seeking David as king over you."
"Conferred": from Hebrew: "the word of Abner was with"
"Elders of Israel": that is, the leaders of the tribes of Israel.

Death of Abner (3:22–39)

Joab's private meeting with Abner (verses 22–27) was due to a combination of reasons, from doubting Abner's sincerity (verse 25), removing a competitor to the position of main commander, to the most relevant one, blood-revenge for the death of Asahel (verses 27, 30), with the clear emphasis that  David had no part in Abner's death. Abner was reported to have departed in peace from David (verses 21, 22, 24), and David did not know of Joab's plan (verse 26). David's claim of being guiltless was accompanied by his curse upon the guilty Joab (verses 28–29), by David's public display of grief (verses 31–32), and touching tribute to Abner (verses 33–34), also by noting the inability of David to resist the violence of the sons of Zeruiah (verse 39). It has been a consistent theme in the books that David was God's chosen to be king, and he was not involved in any of the violent actions that eventually brought him to the throne.

Verse 30
 So Joab and Abishai his brother killed Abner, because he had killed their brother Asahel at Gibeon in the battle.
"Abishai": is not mentioned in the narrative, but might have helped with Joab's plan to kill Abner.

See also

Related Bible parts: 1 Samuel 25, 1 Samuel 31, 2 Samuel 1, 2 Samuel 2, 1 Chronicles 2, 1 Chronicles 3

Notes

References

Sources

Commentaries on Samuel

General

External links
 Jewish translations:
 Samuel II - II Samuel - Chapter 3 (Judaica Press). Hebrew text and English translation [with Rashi's commentary] at Chabad.org
 Christian translations:
 Online Bible at GospelHall.org (ESV, KJV, Darby, American Standard Version, Bible in Basic English)
 2 Samuel chapter 3. Bible Gateway

03